Stratification may refer to:

Mathematics
 Stratification (mathematics), any consistent assignment of numbers to predicate symbols
  Data stratification in statistics

Earth sciences
 Stable and unstable stratification
 Stratification, or stratum, the layering of rocks
 Stratification (archeology), the formation of layers (strata) in which objects are found
 Stratification (water), the formation of water layers based on temperature (and salinity, in oceans)
 Ocean stratification
 Lake stratification
 Atmospheric stratification, the dividing of the Earth's atmosphere into strata
 Inversion (meteorology)

Social sciences
 Social stratification, the dividing of a society into levels based on power or socioeconomic status

Biology
 Stratification (seeds), where seeds are treated to simulate winter conditions so that germination may occur
 Stratification (clinical trials), partitioning of subjects by a factors other than the intervention
 Stratification (vegetation), the vertical layering of vegetation e.g. within a forest
 Population stratification, the stratification of a genetic population based on allele frequencies

Linguistics 

 Stratification (linguistics), the idea that language is organized in hierarchically ordered strata (such as phonology, morphology, syntax, and semantics).

See also 
 Destratification (disambiguation)
 Fuel stratified injection
 Layer (disambiguation)
 Partition (disambiguation)
 Strata (disambiguation)
 Stratified epithelial lining (disambiguation)
 Stratified sampling
 Stratigraphy
 Stratum (disambiguation)